In the singles event at the 2008 Heineken Open tennis tournament in Auckland, New Zealand, David Ferrer was the defending champion, but lost in the quarterfinals to Julien Benneteau.

Philipp Kohlschreiber won in the final 7–6(7–4), 7–5, against Juan Carlos Ferrero.

Seeds

Draw

Finals

Top half

Bottom half

References

External links
 Draw
 Qualifying draw

Singles